"Why Do Fools Fall in Love" is a song by American rock and roll band Frankie Lymon & the Teenagers that was released on January 10, 1956. It reached No. 1 on the R&B chart, No. 6 on Billboard's Pop Singles chart, and No. 1 on the UK Singles Chart in July. Many renditions of the song by other artists have also been hit records in the U.S., including versions by the Diamonds (in 1956), the Beach Boys (in 1964), and Diana Ross (in 1981).

The song was included in Robert Christgau's "Basic Record Library" of 1950s and 1960s recordings—published in Christgau's Record Guide: Rock Albums of the Seventies (1981)—and ranked No. 314 on the Rolling Stone magazine's list of The 500 Greatest Songs of All Time.

Background and authorship
In late 1955, The Teenagers (at that time calling themselves The Premiers) auditioned a song called "Why do Birds Sing So Gay?" for George Goldner, recording producer and owner of Gee Records. Herman Santiago, tenor of the group, had written the song based on a line from some love letters given to the guys by a tenant in bassist Sherman Garnes' apartment building. One of them featured the words "Why do birds sing so gay?," which fit in with lyrics of other songs that Herman had been writing based on a 1-6-2-5 chord pattern. Herman adjusted the harmony to take advantage of Frankie Lymon's high tenor/soprano. Along the way, at Goldner's suggestion, some of the lyrics were changed. During the audition, Frankie's voice stood out and Goldner recommended the lead in subsequent recording sessions be given to Frankie. Frankie did some improvising and recreated the melody to match his own style. According to Jimmy Merchant, what happened at the recording session was a combination of "Frankie's singing ability coupled with George Goldner's special ability to bring out the best in Frankie."

Although early vinyl single releases of "Why Do Fools Fall in Love" credit Frankie Lymon, Herman Santiago, and George Goldner as co-writers of the song, later releases and cover versions were attributed only to Lymon and record producer George Goldner. Goldner's name was later replaced by Morris Levy when Levy bought Goldner's interest in Gee Records, the Teenagers' record company.

After a lengthy court battle, songwriting credits were awarded to original Teenagers members Herman Santiago and Jimmy Merchant in December 1992.

However, in 1996, this ruling was overturned by the Court of Appeals for the 2nd Circuit under the statute of limitations and authorship, because Santiago and Merchant did not bring the case to court soon enough.  This gave the song rights back to Lymon and Levy.  The current publisher of the song is EMI Music Publishing, which still lists these two as the songwriters.

The Beach Boys version

The song was used as a B-side for the Beach Boys single "Fun, Fun, Fun", which reached #5 on the Billboard Hot 100 in 1964. The Beach Boys' version of the song charted at #120. It was included on the Beach Boys 1964 album Shut Down Volume 2 and had only appeared in mono since the release of the single back in 1964. The single mix of the song was later found and used on the 2007 The Warmth of the Sun compilation and on The Original US Singles Collection The Capitol Years 1962–1965. This box set, released in 2008, also used a recently found mono single edit mix. In 2009, a new stereo mix was created with a newly discovered intro, thanks to the discovery of the original multitrack masters by Jon Stebbins and is featured on the band's compilation Summer Love Songs. The song was also performed as part of the band's 50th Anniversary Tour, usually during the first half of the shows. One of the performances was later included on the live album from the tour.

Personnel 
Sourced from Craig Slowinski.

The Beach Boys

 Al Jardine –  harmony and backing vocals
 Mike Love – intro bass vocal, harmony and backing vocals
 Brian Wilson – lead, harmony, and backing vocals, upright piano
 Carl Wilson – harmony and backing vocals
 Dennis Wilson – harmony and backing vocals

Additional musicians

 Leon Russell – upright piano, tack piano
 Al de Lory – grand piano
 Bill Pitman – acoustic guitar
 Tommy Tedesco – electric guitar
 Ray Pohlman – bass guitar
 Jimmy Bond – double bass
 Hal Blaine – drums, timpani
 Frank Capp – glockenspiel, temple blocks, castanets
Steve Douglas – tenor saxophone
Plas Johnson – tenor saxophone
Jay Migliori – baritone saxophone

Diana Ross version

American singer Diana Ross released a cover version on the RCA label on September 25, 1981 as the first single from her album of the same name (1981). She also produced her rendition of the song. It was a hit, peaking at No. 2 on the US adult contemporary chart, No. 4 in the UK Singles Chart, No. 6 on the US R&B chart, and No. 7 on Billboards Pop Singles Chart, and earning her a British Phonographic Industry silver disc award for sales in excess of 250,000 copies. It also reached No.1 in Belgium and the Netherlands and climbed to the top 10 in Ireland, New Zealand and Switzerland as well as making the top 20 in Australia, Canada and West Germany. Unlike the original, this version contains echoes of the soul of the 1960s. A reissue of Ross' cover peaked at No. 36 on the UK chart in July, 1994.

After Ross returned the song to the top ten, a major controversy ensued concerning Lymon's estate. Three women involved in lawsuits and countersuits over Lymon's copyrights and royalties each claimed to be Lymon's rightful widow. The string of court cases were portrayed in the 1998 film Why Do Fools Fall in Love.

In the music video, Ross performs the song on Fremont Street in Las Vegas.

Track listings
 7" single "Why Do Fools Fall in Love" - 2:51
 "Think I'm In Love"

 UK remix CD"Why Do Fools Fall in Love" (159.0 bpm) - 2:53
"I'm Coming Out" (Joey Negro Extended 12", 109.7 bpm) - 6:05
"The Boss" (David Morales Club, taken from: Diana Extended/The Remixes, 124.0 bpm) -  6:29
"Love Hangover"  (Joey Negro Hangover Symphony, 121.0 bpm) - 8:57

 UK reissue 7""Why Do Fools Fall in Love"
"I'm Coming Out" (Joey Negro 7" Mix)

ChartsWeekly chartsYear-end charts'''

Certifications

Legacy
The recording by Frankie Lymon & The Teenagers features in the 1973 film American Graffiti in the scene where Charles Martin Smith's character first notices the mysterious blonde girl. The same recording was also featured on the in-game radio station "Empire Central Radio" in the 2010 video game Mafia II. It is featured in the final episode of the first series of the 2012 BBC drama Call the Midwife, when the character Chummy played by Miranda Hart marries PC Noakes. In 1998, the legacy of the song and its author was the theme of the movie of the same name.

Other charting versions
The Canadian group the Diamonds did a more traditional doo wop version that came out two months after Lymon's in March 1956. This version stayed 19 weeks on the Billboard chart, topping out at No. 12.
Gale Storm released a version of the song as a single in 1956 that reached #9 on the Billboard pop chart.
Gloria Mann released a version of the song as a single in 1956 that reached #59 on the Billboard pop chart.
Alma Cogan released a version of the song as a single in 1956 that reached #25 in the UK.
The Happenings released a slower version of the song, in a harmony-driven soft rock arrangement, as a single in 1967 that reached #41 on the Billboard Hot 100.
Ponderosa Twins Plus One released a version of the song as a single in 1972 that reached #40 on the US R&B chart and #102 on the Billboard'' pop chart.
Joni Mitchell, backed by The Persuasions, released a live version of the song as a single in 1980 that reached #102 on the Bubbling Under Hot 100.

See also
List of UK Singles Chart number ones of the 1950s

References

1956 songs
1956 singles
1967 singles
1972 singles
1980 singles
1981 singles
1994 singles
Songs written by Morris Levy
The Teenagers songs
The Diamonds songs
Diana Ross songs
The Beach Boys songs
Gale Storm songs
Joni Mitchell songs
The Four Seasons (band) songs
Mud (band) songs
Tatyana Ali songs
UK Singles Chart number-one singles
Gee Records singles
Capitol Records singles
RCA Records singles
Dot Records singles
Decca Records singles
His Master's Voice singles
B.T. Puppy records singles
Asylum Records singles